Ajooba is a 1990 superhero film, produced and directed by Shashi Kapoor and co-directed by Soviet filmmaker Gennadi Vasilyev. An Indian-Soviet co-production, it is loosely based on Arabic folklore such as One Thousand and One Nights. The film had a Russian language version released in the Soviet Union, Черный принц Аджуба (Black Prince Ajuba), in 1990, before its Indian release in 1991.

Plot
The Afghan kingdom of Baharistan is ruled by a kind Sultan (Shammi Kapoor). All is well in the land, except that Sultan seemingly can't have any child. An evil devil-worshipping Vazir (Amrish Puri) seeks to usurp the throne, reviving his "Fauladi Shaitan" (a huge demon-like figure made of stone) and take over the world. Vazir instructs his maids to strangle every child born to Sultan. Finally, however, a spark of divine intervention (presented literally as a spark which descends from the heavens and enters the womb) renders the next newborn son immune to the poisons and strangulations administered by the maids. This Shehzada (Prince) eventually becomes Ajooba (Miracle).

Sultan and his wife Malika (Ariadna Shengelaya) kick off celebrations throughout the land. The good court magician Ameer Khan (Saeed Jaffrey), fondly called "Ameer Baba", the very much close friend of Sultan, recently returned from his travels to Hind (India), presents a magic sword to Sultan. Sultan thrusts it into a pillar (verifying its keenness) and Ameer Baba pronounces that it may be drawn out of the stone again only by a member of the royal family (rather like the Excalibur).

Soon after, Sultan privately discusses about the traitors in the kingdom, with Ameer Baba. Vazir overhears their discussion, eventually tricks Ameer Baba, steals his Necklace of Immortality, throws him into the dungeon, attempts to murder Sultan and his family and take over the throne. Sultan escapes with his wife and child. After a pitched battle involving magic carpets, storms and ships, Sultan is missing. Malika is blinded and the young Shehzada is washed ashore by a dolphin (whom he eventually thinks of as his mother) to a blacksmith. This blacksmith adopts the kid, trains him in all the worldly and martial arts and thus creates Ajooba. In the meantime, Vazir blames Ameer Baba for Sultan's murder, takes over the throne and begins ravaging the land, always uttering his slogan Shaitan Zindabad (Long live the Devil).

Ajooba is a masked rider in black (rather like Zorro) who thwarts Vazir's lackeys as they pillage the lands and harass the citizens. His plain self is Ali, an ordinary restaurateur and his chum is Hassan (Rishi Kapoor). Together they foil Vazir's evil schemes, raid his caravans and woo their girls. Ali falls for Rukhsana (Dimple Kapadia), the daughter of Ameer Baba, returned from Hind to rescue her imprisoned father), while Hassan's affections are for Vazir's Shehzadi Henna (Sonam).

Ajooba inflicts constant pain upon Vazir. Vazir eventually raises his Fauladi Shaitan and plans an all-out attack. The King of Hind, Karan Singh (Dara Singh) brings his forces to aid Ajooba. The resulting war brings all the central characters together.

Several questions are essentially resolved in the ensuing war. The climax is a panorama of demons, magical horses and donkeys, a full-scale combat between Vazir's army and the Hind army, enchanted swords and a final revelation about the true identity of Ajooba.

Cast
Amitabh Bachchan as Shehzada Ali / Ajooba
Rishi Kapoor as Hassan
Dimple Kapadia as Rukhsana Khan 
Sonam as Shehzadi Henna 
Shammi Kapoor as Sultan / Peer Baba
Saeed Jaffrey as Magician Ameer Khan / Baba
Sushma Seth as Zarina Khan
Ariadna Shengelaya as Malika 
Dara Singh as Maharaja Karan Singh
Tej Sapru as Prince Udham Singh
Tinu Anand as Anwar Khan
Dalip Tahil as Shah Rukh 
Amrish Puri as Vazir
Georgi Darchiashvili  as Altaf
Narendranath as Sharafat Khan
Mac Mohan as Bandit
Sudhir as Bandit
Yunus Parvez as Bandit
C. S. Dubey as Bandit 
Praveen Kumar Sobti as Vazir's Soldier 
Manik Irani as Vazir's Soldier 
Bob Christo as Vazir's Soldier

Production
The film was made in the wake of Alibaba Aur 40 Chor (1980), an earlier Arabian Nights themed Indian-Soviet production (based on the story of Ali Baba) that became a success in both India and the Soviet Union.

This film was produced in association with Gorky Film Studio in Moscow. There are several Russian stars whose speech is not in sync with Hindi dialogues. Supposedly, Amitabh Bachchan worked in this film gratis, as a favor to his longtime collaborator and friend Shashi Kapoor.

Soundtrack

Box office
The film was a financial success in the Soviet Union, where it was released as Черный принц Аджуба (Black Prince Ajuba) in July 1990. It was the last successful collaboration between the Indian and Soviet film industries.

In India, the film was commercially unsuccessful at the box office.

References

External links 
 

1990 films
1990 directorial debut films
1991 films
1991 directorial debut films
1990s multilingual films
1990s Hindi-language films
1990s Indian superhero films
Films scored by Laxmikant–Pyarelal
Fictional Afghan people
Indian fantasy action films
Indian multilingual films
1990s Russian-language films
Soviet fantasy films
Soviet multilingual films
Soviet superhero films
1990s Urdu-language films
Indian superhero films